Nala is a village in the Khyber Pakhtunkhwa Province of Pakistan. It is located at 34°11'5"N 73°26'20"E with an altitude of 1694 metres (5561 feet).

References

Villages in Khyber Pakhtunkhwa